Four-handed may refer to:

 Four-handed All Fours, four player card game
 Four-player chess, chess variant
 Piano four hands, when two players play on a single piano.